"Flamboyant" is a song by American rapper and songwriter Big L. It appears as the tenth track on his second and final studio album The Big Picture, posthumously released. It was his fifth released and first posthumous single. It topped the US Rap charts, while it peaked at number 39 on the US R&B charts.

Release
The single topped the US Rap charts on June 24, 2000 and stayed there for three weeks, then spending 28 weeks on the charts. It also spent fourteen weeks on the US R&B charts.

Track listings
 12" single
 "Flamboyant" (Clean) – 3:11
 "Flamboyant" (Dirty) – 3:11
 "Flamboyant" (Instrumental) – 3:11
 "Flamboyant" (Acapella) – 3:11
 "On the Mic" (Clean) – 3:26
 "On the Mic" (Dirty) – 3:26
 "On the Mic" (Instrumental) – 3:26
 "On the Mic" (Acapella) – 3:26

 CD and cassette single
 "Flamboyant" – 3:11
 "Flamboyant" (Instrumental) – 3:11
 "On the Mic" – 3:26
 "On the Mic" (Instrumental) – 3:26

Personnel
Big L - vocals, songwriter
Dee Ervin - songwriter
Mike Heron - songwriter, producer
Wes Farrell - songwriter
Max Vargas - recorder
DJ Sebb - scratcher
Louis Alfred III - mixer

Charts

References

2000 singles
2000 songs
1999 songs
1998 songs
Rawkus Records singles
Priority Records singles
Big L songs
Songs released posthumously